Kgosietsile Mampori is a Botswana footballer who currently plays for Uniao Flamengo Santos as a striker. He won his only cap for the Botswana national football team in 2004.

External links
 

Living people
Association football forwards
Botswana footballers
Mochudi Centre Chiefs SC players
Botswana international footballers
Uniao Flamengo Santos F.C. players
Year of birth missing (living people)